Ashley Errol Williams (born 23 August 1984) is a British former professional footballer who played as a centre-back.

After being released from West Bromwich Albion as a teenager, Williams played for non-league side Hednesford Town before turning professional at Stockport County in 2003, later becoming their captain. In March 2008, he was loaned to Swansea City, and after helping them win League One title, signed for a then club record £400,000. He amassed 352 appearances for the Swans, scoring 14 goals. He aided them in their promotion to the Premier League and their victory in the 2013 Football League Cup Final.

In August 2016, he signed a three-year contract with fellow Premier League side Everton for a fee of £12 million. Williams was a regular in his first season at Goodison Park but eventually fell out of favour and he spent the 2018–19 season on loan at Stoke City. Upon his release by Everton, Williams signed a short-term deal with Bristol City in August 2019 which was extended in November of that year. He left the club at the end of the 2019–20 season and announced his retirement in January 2021 at the age of 36.

Born in England, Williams qualified to play for Wales through his maternal grandfather. He made his debut for them in March 2008 and earned 86 caps, scoring twice. He captained the team at Euro 2016, where Wales reached the semi-finals.

Club career

Early career
Born in Wolverhampton, West Midlands, Williams began his career at West Bromwich Albion as a youth player but was released by the club at age 16. He went on to play for non-league Hednesford Town.

Stockport County

In late 2003 he left to join Division Two side Stockport County Williams later became captain of Stockport and was still at the club when he made his international debut for Wales. In November 2007, Williams won both the inaugural North-West League Two Player of the Year Award and the North-West Player of the Year Award.

Swansea City
In March 2008, Williams signed for Swansea City on loan until the end of the 2007–08 season, with a view to a permanent transfer. After helping Swansea win the League One title and, with it, promotion to the second tier of English football for the first time in 24 years, the move was made permanent for a reported £400,000, a club record transfer fee at the time.

On 16 September 2008, Williams scored his first Swansea goal in a 1–1 draw against Derby County. The defender impressed during his first season at Championship level, eventually going on to be named Wales Footballer of the Year at an FAW awards dinner in November 2009. Williams also picked up the Clubman of the Year award at the same event.

After finishing in eighth position during their first Championship campaign, Swansea improved on their position by one place the following season, missing out on a play-off position by a single point. Williams was part of a defence that conceded only 37 goals during that campaign, and was selected in the 2009–10 Championship PFA Team of the Year at the end of the season.

The 2010–11 season saw Swansea and Williams gain promotion to the Premier League via a play-off final win at Wembley Stadium. Williams was named in the Championship PFA Team of the Year for the second consecutive season. The season also saw him equal and surpass a club record of 106 consecutive matches, previously jointly held by Andy Legg and Gilbert Beech.

Swansea's first Premier League season began with a 4–0 loss at eventual champions Manchester City, but the club went on to finish the season in 11th place. On 24 September 2011, Williams scored his first ever Premier League goal in a 4–1 loss at Chelsea, after heading in a Mark Gower free kick.

In October 2012, Williams signed a new three-year contract with Swansea. The club's second season in the Premier League saw a ninth-placed finish and a first major trophy win in English football for Williams and Swansea, following a 5–0 win over Bradford City in the 2013 League Cup final on 24 February 2013. After captaining the team during the final at Wembley, Williams lifted the trophy with club captain Garry Monk, who had come on as a second-half substitute.

In July 2013, after acting as captain for the majority of Swansea's matches during the previous two seasons, Williams was permanently handed the club captaincy after Monk stepped down from the role. On 4 July 2014, Williams signed a new four-year contract with Swansea. On 19 April 2015, he was selected in the Team of the Decade at the Football League Awards.

Everton

On 10 August 2016, Williams joined Everton on a three-year contract for a £12 million transfer fee. He made his debut ten days later as a substitute in a 2–1 win against West Bromwich Albion at The Hawthorns, and three days after that, made his first start for Everton in a 4–0 EFL Cup win at home to Yeovil Town. Williams scored his first Everton goal with an 86th-minute header to secure a 2–1 win over Arsenal on 13 December. On 4 April 2017, he was sent-off at Manchester United for handling a goalbound shot by Luke Shaw, from which Zlatan Ibrahimović scored a penalty to equalise in a 1–1 draw.

Williams scored Everton's goal in their 2–1 Europa League group stage home loss to Lyon on 19 October 2017. He was also booked in that match for pushing Lyon goalkeeper Anthony Lopes into an advertising board, prompting a brawl involving both sets of players and Everton supporters. After the match, Everton manager Ronald Koeman said Williams needed to work on his self-control.

Loan to Stoke City
On 2 August 2018, Williams joined Stoke City on loan for the 2018–19 season. He made his debut nine days later in a 1–1 home draw with Brentford, replacing the injured Bruno Martins Indi after 26 minutes. On 22 August, he was sent off in a 3–0 loss to Wigan Athletic. Williams played 37 times for Stoke during the season, scoring once in a 2–2 draw with Norwich City on 22 April 2019.

Williams was released by Everton at the end of the 2018–19 season.

Bristol City
On 23 August 2019, Williams signed a short-term deal with Championship club Bristol City that would run until "mid-January". His club debut came at previous team Stoke, before making his first home appearance against longtime former employers Swansea. He scored his first goal for Bristol City on 1 November 2019 in a 2–2 draw with Barnsley. In November 2019, he signed an extended deal until the end of the 2019–20 season. He left the club at the end of the season on the expiration of his contract.

Retirement
On 26 January 2021, Williams announced his retirement from professional football, aged 36.

International career

Williams qualifies for the Wales national team through his maternal grandfather Bill Rowlands from Gelli, Rhondda. He made his international debut on 26 March 2008, two days before securing his move to Swansea City. In the match, he played the full 90 minutes for John Toshack's men in their 2–0 friendly away win in Luxembourg, making an early error through a poor backpass to goalkeeper Lewis Price, but recovered possession in time.

On 1 April 2009, Williams scored an own goal in a 2–0 loss to Germany in qualification for the 2010 FIFA World Cup, deflecting Mario Gómez's cross at the Millennium Stadium. He captained the country for the first time on 14 November in a 3–0 friendly win over Scotland at the Cardiff City Stadium. On 11 October 2010, he scored his first international goal in a 5–1 friendly win over Luxembourg in Parc y Scarlets, finishing a header from debutant Steve Morison.

In October 2012, Williams was named captain of Wales by manager Chris Coleman, replacing Aaron Ramsey. Coleman, who by that point had not won in his four matches, awarded the armband to Williams on account of his experience over the younger Ramsey. The decision was criticised by Raymond Verheijen, the assistant to Coleman's predecessor, Gary Speed.

On 31 May 2016, Williams was named in Coleman's 23-man squad for UEFA Euro 2016, Wales' first major tournament for more than half a century. On 1 July in Lille, Williams headed the equalising goal, against Belgium in the quarter-finals as Wales eventually won 3–1 to progress to the semi-finals for the first time in their international football history. In the semi-final, Wales lost 2–0 to Portugal.

Williams earned 86 caps for Wales and scored two goals with his last cap coming in June 2019 in a 1–0 away loss to Hungary.

Personal life
Williams is of Jamaican descent through his father and of Welsh descent through his mother. In his time at Hednesford Town, Williams supported himself with various jobs including at a petrol station, as a waiter at Beefeater, and running a sideshow at Drayton Manor.

In December 2010, Williams established the charity WillsWorld with his wife Vanessa, with a view to helping under-privileged children. He is also a patron of Street Football Wales which fights social exclusion, and the Ethan Perkins Trust, which raises funds for research, support and awareness into childhood brain tumours.

Williams was a Liverpool fan as a child and his favourite player was John Barnes. He also likes basketball and supports the Miami Heat.

Career statistics

International
Source:

International goals
Wales score listed first, score column indicates score after each Williams goal.

Honours
Swansea City
Football League Cup: 2012–13
Football League Championship play-offs: 2010–11

Individual
PFA Team of the Year: 2009–10 Championship, 2010–11 Championship
The Football League Team of the Decade
Welsh Footballer of the Year: 2009

References

External links

Ashley Williams profile at the Bristol City F.C. website

1984 births
Living people
Footballers from Wolverhampton
Welsh footballers
Wales international footballers
English footballers
Welsh people of Jamaican descent
British sportspeople of Jamaican descent
English people of Welsh descent
English sportspeople of Jamaican descent
Association football defenders
West Bromwich Albion F.C. players
Hednesford Town F.C. players
Stockport County F.C. players
Swansea City A.F.C. players
Everton F.C. players
Stoke City F.C. players
Bristol City F.C. players
Southern Football League players
English Football League players
Premier League players
UEFA Euro 2016 players
Black British sportsmen